McLane Creek is a stream in Thurston County in the U.S. state of Washington. It enters Puget Sound at the southern end of Mud Bay on Eld Inlet.

McLane Creek was named after William McLane, a pioneer settler and territorial politician.

In 1999, ashes of Kurt Cobain were scattered in McLane Creek by his daughter.

References

Rivers of Thurston County, Washington
Rivers of Washington (state)